Bardača is a lake and marshes complex in the municipality of Srbac, northern Republika Srpska, Bosnia and Herzegovina. It lies about 30 kilometres from Banja Luka. Area of the lake and marshes are protected as nature park (Nature Monument – IUCN Category III), Bardača Nature Park. It is designated as a Ramsar site.

See also
List of lakes in Bosnia and Herzegovina
List of protected areas of Bosnia and Herzegovina

References

Lakes of Bosnia and Herzegovina
Protected areas of Bosnia and Herzegovina
Nature conservation in Bosnia and Herzegovina
Tourist attractions in Bosnia and Herzegovina
IUCN Category III
Nature parks of Bosnia and Herzegovina
Ramsar sites in Bosnia and Herzegovina
Important Bird Areas of Bosnia and Herzegovina